Larry P. Means (born April 20, 1947) was a Democratic member of the Alabama Senate, representing the 10th District from 1998 to 2010. Defeated in the 2010 Election, He was again defeated in a rematch in 2014.

External links
Alabama State Legislature - Senator Larry Means official government website
Project Vote Smart - Senator Larry Means (AL) profile
Follow the Money - Larry Means
2006 2002 1998 campaign contributions

References
Dothan Eagle
CNN

Alabama state senators
1947 births
Living people
People from Etowah County, Alabama